An Acadian is a native of Acadia, a region of northeastern North America.

Acadian may also refer to:
Acadian (train), a Southern Pacific passenger train
Acadian (automobile), a make of automobile produced by General Motors of Canada
Acadian French, a French dialect
Acadian flycatcher, a small insect-eating bird
Acadian orogeny, a middle Paleozoic deformation in geology
Acadian Peninsula, a peninsula in North America
Acadian World Congress, a festival held every five years
List of Acadians, notable people of Acadian origin
Acadian Coast, historical term for the area along the Mississippi River settled by Acadians in the 18th century

See also
Akkadian (disambiguation)
Acadia (disambiguation)
Acadian House (disambiguation)
Acadiana, a large region of south Louisiana that is home to the Cajun branch of Acadian culture